Grunt, grunts or grunting may refer to:

Sound and music 
 Grunting (tennis), in tennis refers to the loud noise, sometimes described as "shrieking" or "screaming", made by some players during their strokes
 Death grunt, the death metal singing style
 Grunt Records, a vanity label founded in 1971 by Jefferson Airplane and distributed by RCA Records
 "The Grunt", a 1970 instrumental recording by The J.B.'s

Food and animals 
 A jug of 32 ounces of liquid, half a growler (usually beer)
 A food preparation similar to a cobbler
 A family of fishes, also known as Haemulidae
 Grunt-fish, the only member of the fish family Rhamphocottidae

Technology 
 Grunt (software), a JavaScript Task Runner
 Fobos-Grunt, a failed Russian mission to Phobos, one of the moons of Mars

Military 
 An infantryman, in American military slang
 Grunt (G.I. Joe), a fictional character in the G.I. Joe universe

Games 
 Grunt (board wargame), a 1971 tactical wargame
 Gruntz, a 1999 puzzle/strategy game

Many games use the "simple soldier" meaning, to a point that the word is now common parlance within gaming communities for the easiest 'popcorn' enemies:
 A Warcraft, orcish warrior
 The simplest unit in the video game Z
 The smallest enemy in the video game Metal Arms: Glitch in the System
 A class in the multiplayer mode of the video game Conker: Live & Reloaded
 An enemy in the Half-Life universe
 The weakest monster in Quake
 Grunt (Halo), an alien in the game Halo
 Grunt (Mass Effect), Krogan squadmate in Mass Effect 2
 A low-ranking member of a crime syndicate in the Pokémon games

Fiction 
 Grunts!, a 1992 fantasy novel by Mary Gentle
 Grunt!, a 1983 Italian film featured in the movie Troll 2
 The Brothers Grunt, an MTV animated series

Other uses 
 Michał Grunt (born 1993), Polish professional footballer
 Grunt (horse)
 Grunts, the main species in Madness Combat

See also 
 Grund (disambiguation)
 Grundt, a surname
 Grunty (disambiguation)